Sandy Koufax of the Los Angeles Dodgers pitched a perfect game in the National League against the Chicago Cubs at Dodger Stadium on Thursday, September 9, 1965. The game was not televised. 

Koufax, by retiring 27 consecutive batters without allowing any to reach base, became the sixth pitcher of the modern era, eighth overall, to throw a perfect game. The game was Koufax's fourth no-hitter, breaking Bob Feller's Major League record of three (and later broken by Nolan Ryan, in 1981). Koufax struck out 14 opposing batters, the most ever recorded in a perfect game, and matched only by San Francisco Giants pitcher, Matt Cain, on June 13, 2012. He also struck out at least one batter in all nine innings (Cain did not strike out a batter in the ninth in his perfect game), the only perfect game pitcher to do so to date.

The game was also notable for the high quality of the performance by the opposing pitcher, Bob Hendley of the Cubs. Hendley gave up only one hit (which did not figure into the scoring) and allowed only two baserunners, though even if Hendley did not allow the hit, the rule change in 1991 would make the no-hitter not count. Both pitchers had no-hitters intact until the seventh inning. The only run that the Dodgers scored was unearned. The game holds the record for fewest base runners in  a perfect game (both teams), with two; the next lowest total is four. This is also the only game in MLB history where both teams combined to only have a single hit, which holds the record for least hits in a game by both teams, a record only breakable by a double no-hitter.

Koufax's perfect game is a memorable part of baseball lore. Jane Leavy's biography of Koufax is structured around a re-telling of the game. An article in Salon.com honoring Dodgers broadcaster Vin Scully focuses on his play-by-play call of the game for KFI radio. This game was selected in a 1995 poll of members of the Society for American Baseball Research as the greatest game ever pitched.

The game
Koufax had not won a game in three weeks; not since Juan Marichal hit Koufax's catcher, John Roseboro, in the head with a baseball bat. The Dodgers were playing at home against the eighth-place Chicago Cubs. Bob Hendley, the pitcher for the Cubs, was just up from the minor leagues and had a 2–2 record.

Koufax retired the first batter he faced, Donald Young, a late season call-up, on a pop-up on the second pitch of the game. Glenn Beckert, another rookie, struck out looking at a curveball after hitting a line drive down the first base line just barely foul. The third batter, Billy Williams, also struck out looking at a curve ball. In the second inning, Ron Santo fouled out to catcher Jeff Torborg, Ernie Banks struck out on a forkball, and Byron Browne, during his first major league at-bat, lined out to center fielder Willie Davis. Koufax got Chris Krug to line out to center field to start off the third inning. Following him, Don Kessinger flew out on an 0–2 pitch and Hendley struck out. In the fourth inning, Koufax got Young to fly out to the first baseman and Beckert to fly out to right. Koufax then struck out Williams a second time.

In the top half of the fifth inning, the Cubs went three up, three down with Santo flying out, Banks striking out for the second time in the game, and Browne grounding out. By the bottom of the fifth, neither team had reached first base. That changed when Hendley walked Lou Johnson on a three-and-two pitch that could have gone either way. Ron Fairly dropped a sacrifice bunt that Hendley bobbled, leaving his only play at first base. On the first pitch to Jim Lefebvre, Johnson stole third base. The Cubs' catcher Krug threw the ball over Santo's head and into left field, which allowed Johnson to score. The Dodgers had scored a run without an official at-bat or RBI.

The bottom of the order came up in the sixth inning for the Cubs. Krug grounded the ball to shortstop Maury Wills, who threw it in the dirt to first baseman Wes Parker. Parker managed to dig the ball out to save the play and Koufax's perfect game. Kessinger hit a dribbler down the third base line, but Junior Gilliam was playing shallow (to guard against the bunt) and threw him out by half a step. Hendley, who still had a no-hitter going of his own, struck out on three pitches.

Koufax's performance worsened briefly in the seventh, when he threw one pitch that sailed past Young and went all the way to the backstop. Koufax recovered and struck out Young. Beckert was next; he flew out to right field. Williams started out with three straight balls. Koufax's next two pitches were fastballs right down the middle. Williams let the first one go and fouled off the second one. Williams ended up hitting a pop fly to left field on the next pitch. During the bottom of the seventh inning, Johnson broke up Hendley's no-hitter with a bloop hit behind the second baseman. By the time Banks reached it, Johnson was on second base. Fairly grounded out to second, stranding Johnson on second base.

The heart of the Chicago order came up in the eighth inning, and Koufax struck out all three of them. Banks, who struck out for the third time, never made contact the entire game. The Dodgers went three up and three down in the bottom half of the inning. Koufax again struck out the side in the ninth inning to secure the perfect game. Not until the San Francisco Giants' Chris Heston no-hit the New York Mets on June 9, 2015, would another pitcher complete a no-hitter by striking out the final three batters he faced, and the next no-hitter whose pitcher struck out all three batters he faced in the ninth inning wouldn't come until August 30 of the same season, when the Cubs' Jake Arrieta no-hit the Dodgers—a game also played at Dodger Stadium. Koufax also struck out at least one batter in all nine innings, the only perfect game pitcher to do so to date. Not until Nolan Ryan in  would a no-hit pitcher strike out at least one batter in all nine innings, doing so in the first of his seven career no-hitters; Koufax's catcher, Jeff Torborg, would catch that no-hitter as well. As Vin Scully, the Dodgers' long time play-by-play announcer, commented at the end: "And Sandy Koufax, whose name will always remind you of strikeouts, did it with a flourish. He struck out the last six consecutive batters. So when he wrote his name in capital letters in the record books, that "K" stands out even more than the O-U-F-A-X." The final out was made by Harvey Kuenn, the same man who made the final out of Koufax's 1963 no-hitter—which had been, appropriately, a ground ball back to Koufax. In the end, Johnson's hit was the only one by either team; the combined total of 1 hit for the entire game is a major league record. Koufax threw 113 pitches during the game, 79 of which were strikes.

Five days after the perfect game, the Koufax-Hendley rematch took place at Wrigley Field. This time, Hendley defeated Koufax, 2–1.

Until the Philadelphia Phillies' Cole Hamels, a future Cub, no-hit the Cubs on July 25, 2015, the perfect game had been the last no-hitter to be pitched against them. They had gone the longest of all Major League teams since a no-hitter was last pitched against them—a span of 7,920 games.

According to Leavy, it was known throughout the league that Koufax "telegraphed" his pitches: another "hitch" in his windup told batters whether the curveball or fastball was coming. Cubs outfielder Al Spangler reminded teammates of this just before the game. Cubs player Billy Williams later groused that "We knew what was coming, and we still couldn't hit it."

In 2015, Grantland gave a detailed account of the game for the 50th anniversary of its occurrence, featuring a video clip of an interview Koufax gave after the game as well as other video clips interviewing those involved in this game.

Game statistics
September 9, Dodger Stadium, Los Angeles, California

Box score

Notes

References

External links
 Sandy Koufax - Biography and Career Highlights
 Salon Brilliant Careers - Vin Scully
 Transcript of Vin Scully's radio call of the ninth inning
 retrosheet.org box score and play by play
 baseball-reference.com box score and play by play
 / Audio of Vin Scully's call

1965 Major League Baseball season
Major League Baseball perfect games
Los Angeles Dodgers
Chicago Cubs
1965 in sports in California
September 1965 sports events in the United States
1965 in Los Angeles
Sports competitions in Los Angeles